Michel Boudreau (born September 26, 1952) is a Canadian former  professional ice hockey player who played in the World Hockey Association (WHA). Boudreau  was selected by the Boston Bruins in the third round (48th overall) of the 1972 NHL Amateur Draft.

Including playoffs, Boudreau appeared in 38 WHA games, recording eight goals and seven assists, along with four penalty minutes.

Career statistics

References

External links
 

1952 births
Boston Bruins draft picks
Canadian ice hockey centres
Drummondville Rangers players
Hampton Gulls (SHL) players
Ice hockey people from Quebec
Laval National players
Living people
People from Val-des-Sources
Philadelphia Blazers players
Roanoke Valley Rebels (EHL) players
Roanoke Valley Rebels (SHL) players
Tidewater Sharks players
Vancouver Blazers players